Amanita multisquamosa or the small funnel-veil amanita is a species of Amanita from the coniferous forest of eastern North America.

References

External links
 
 

multisquamosa
Fungi of North America
Fungi described in 1901
Taxa named by Charles Horton Peck